The 1913 Newfoundland general election was held on 30 October 1913 to elect members of the 23rd General Assembly of Newfoundland in the Dominion of Newfoundland. The Liberal Party led by Robert Bond formed a coalition with the Fishermen's Protective Union led by William Coaker. Although the majority held by the Newfoundland People's Party was reduced in this election, it was again returned to power and Edward P. Morris continued to serve as Prime Minister of Newfoundland. A general election originally scheduled for 1917 was deferred until 1919 because of World War I. After Morris retired from politics in 1918, William F. Lloyd, a Liberal member of the Executive Council, was asked to form a government. In May 1919, Michael Patrick Cashin, the leader of the People's Party, introduced a motion of no confidence which resulted in the defeat of the government. Cashin served as Newfoundland prime minister until the election held later in 1919.

Seat totals

Members elected

 Bay de Verde
 Albert E. Hickman Liberal (coalition)
 John C. Crosbie People's Party
 Bonavista Bay
 William F. Coaker FPU (coalition)
 Alfred B. Morine FPU (coalition), elected in 1914
 Robert G. Winsor FPU (coalition)
 John Abbott FPU (coalition)
 Burgeo-LaPoile
 Robert Moulton People's Party
 Burin
 John S. Currie People's Party
 Thomas LeFeuvre People's Party
 Carbonear
 John Goodison People's Party (speaker)
 Ferryland
 Michael P. Cashin People's Party
 Phillip F. Moore People's Party
 Fogo
 William W. Halfyard FPU (coalition)
 Fortune Bay
 Charles Emerson People's Party
 Harbour Grace
 A. W. Piccott People's Party
 E. Parsons People's Party
 M. M. Young People's Party
 Harbour Main
 William Woodford People's Party
 G. Kennedy People's Party
 Placentia and St. Mary's
 R. J. Devereaux People's Party
 Frank J. Morris People's Party
 William J. Walsh People's Party
 Port de Grave
 George F. Grimes FPU (coalition)
 St. Barbe
 William M. Clapp Liberal (coalition)
 St. George's
 Joseph F. Downey People's Party
 St. John's East
 James M. Kent Liberal (coalition)
 William J. Higgins People's Party
 J. Dwyer Liberal (coalition)
 St. John's West
 Edward P. Morris People's Party
 John R. Bennett People's Party
 Michael J. Kennedy People's Party
 Trinity Bay
 John G. Stone FPU (coalition)
 Archibald Targett FPU (coalition)
 William F. Lloyd Liberal (coalition)
 Twillingate
 Robert Bond Liberal (coalition)
 William F. Coaker FPU (coalition), elected in 1914
 James A. Clift Liberal (coalition)
 Walter Jennings FPU (coalition)

Notes:
In 1914, Bond resigned his seat in the assembly. In the same year, Coaker resigned his seat in Bonavista to allow Alfred B. Morine to be elected there and successfully ran for reelection to the seat vacated by Bond.

Notes

References 

 
 

1913
1913 elections in North America
1913 elections in Canada
Politics of the Dominion of Newfoundland
1913 in Newfoundland
October 1913 events